"The Maker Said Take Her" is a song written by Ronnie Rogers and Mark Wright, and recorded by American country music group Alabama.  It was released in June 1996 as the fifth and final single from their album In Pictures.  It peaked at number 4 on the United States Billboard Hot Country Singles & Tracks chart, and at number 13 on the Canadian RPM Country Tracks chart.

Chart positions
"The Maker Said Take Her" debuted at number 65 on the U.S. Billboard Hot Country Singles & Tracks for the week of July 20, 1996.

Year-end charts

References

1995 songs
Alabama (American band) songs
1996 singles
Songs written by Ronnie Rogers
Songs written by Mark Wright (record producer)
Song recordings produced by Emory Gordy Jr.
RCA Records singles